Bernadette Sebage Rathedi is a Botswana diplomat and was the Ambassador Extraordinary and Plenipotentiary of the Republic of Botswana to Sweden, with concurrent accreditation to Russia, Iceland, Norway, Denmark, Finland and Ukraine.  She was also ambassador to Poland, having presented her credentials on January 17, 2012.

A former protocol chief at the Botswana Ministry of Foreign Affairs and International Cooperation, Rathedi was appointed as Botswana's Ambassador to Sweden in June 2005.

References 

Botswana women diplomats
Ambassadors of Botswana to Russia
Ambassadors of Botswana to Sweden
Ambassadors of Botswana to Iceland
Ambassadors of Botswana to Norway
Ambassadors of Botswana to Denmark
Ambassadors of Botswana to Finland
Ambassadors of Botswana to Ukraine
Ambassadors to Poland
Living people
Year of birth missing (living people)
Women ambassadors